Ruth Elizabeth Warrick (June 29, 1916 – January 15, 2005) was an American singer, actress and political activist, best known for her role as Phoebe Tyler Wallingford on All My Children, which she played regularly from 1970 until her death in 2005. She made her film debut in Citizen Kane, and years later celebrated her 80th birthday by attending a special screening of the film.

Early life and career

Ruth Warrick was born June 29, 1916, in Saint Joseph, Missouri, to Frederick Roswell Warrick and Annie Louise   Warrick, nee Scott. By writing an essay in high school called "Prevention and Cure of Tuberculosis", Warrick won a contest to be Miss Jubilesta, Missouri's paid ambassador to New York City. There she began her career as a radio singer, and met her first husband Erik Rolf.

Warrick's first big break was being hired by a young Orson Welles for Citizen Kane (1941), in which she played Emily Monroe Norton, niece of the President of the United States and Kane's first wife. Welles pulled her photograph from the hundreds he had been sent by agents; he recognized her from a radio show they had worked on together in 1938. He spoke with her in New York: "I'm not looking for an actress that can play a lady," he said, "I want an actress who is a lady." She was in California within days, making several screen tests including one with Welles, and was regarded as perfect for the role. Warrick was expecting her first child during the filming of Kane, which prevented her being cast in The Magnificent Ambersons; but she worked on a 1942 episode ("My Little Boy") of Welles's radio series, and Welles hired her again for Journey into Fear (1943).

She appeared in The Corsican Brothers, The Iron Major, Mr. Winkle Goes to War, and Guest in the House.
Following World War II, she had a role in the Academy Award-winning Disney film Song of the South; she also appeared in Daisy Kenyon, which starred Joan Crawford and Henry Fonda, but by the late 1940s her film roles were becoming infrequent and less notable. After playing Betty Hutton's sister-in-law in Let's Dance, she starred as a troubled wife looking back at her life in the religious drama Second Chance and an alcoholic wife and mother in One Too Many (all 1950).

In the 1950s, she befriended soap opera executives Irna Phillips and Agnes Nixon. Warrick became a cast member on the soap opera The Guiding Light, playing Janet Johnson, R.N. from 1953 to 1954. Phillips was impressed by Warrick's performance and hired her for her new soap opera, As the World Turns when the show debuted in 1956. Her character, Edith Hughes, was madly in love with a married man, Jim Lowell. Phillips wanted the characters to live happily ever after, but Procter & Gamble, which owned the show, demanded that the characters not endorse adultery, so Jim "died". She stayed on the show until 1960.

From 1959 to 1960, she understudied for Una Merkel and (future All My Children co-star) Eileen Herlie in the Broadway musical, Take Me Along. During the 1961-62 television season, she starred in Father of the Bride television series. Then, in 1965, she joined the cast of the primetime serial, Peyton Place, playing Hannah Cord. While there had been primetime serials before (such as One Man's Family), none previously had enjoyed the phenomenal success of Peyton Place. Warrick received an Emmy Award nomination for her work on this show in 1967, the same year she left the show. In 1969, she made her last major film, The Great Bank Robbery. During this time, Agnes Nixon had been moving up the daytime television ranks. She had created her own show, One Life to Live, in 1968. ABC approved her new show, All My Children, in 1969.

All My Children

When All My Children debuted on January 5, 1970, Warrick was among the contracted cast, playing Pine Valley's imperious matriarch Phoebe Tyler (the character's full name via her marriages would eventually be Phoebe English Tyler Wallingford Matthews Wallingford). The show was an instant hit and Phoebe became a popular character. While her role was originally that of a serious society snob concerned mainly with keeping her family's name at the top of the town's social register, she later began to add much humor into the role, especially when her character, separated from her husband of many years, began having an affair with a phony professor Langley Wallingford, and eventually married him. Warrick received Daytime Emmy Award nominations in 1975 and 1977.

Due to health problems, actor Louis Edmonds, who portrayed Warrick's All My Children husband, left the show in 1995. Combined with Warrick's own health problems, that signaled a reduction in her screen time in the 1990s. Warrick broke her hip while on vacation in Greece in 2001 and thenceforth used a wheelchair. She had a brief re-emergence in 2002 when Phoebe made a return appearance at a hospital board meeting and later attended a society function with niece Brooke. Warrick was seldom on screen, but did appear on All My Children'''s 35th anniversary show on January 5, 2005. This would be Warrick's final screen appearance.

Singing, writing and politics
In 1971, she published a single with the song 41,000 Plus 4 The Ballad of the Kent State Massacre as a tribute to Sandra Lee Scheuer, William Knox Schroeder, Jeffrey Glenn Miller and Allison Beth Krause, the four students killed at Kent State University during a demonstration against the Vietnam war. She published her autobiography, The Confessions of Phoebe Tyler (co-written by Don Preston) in 1980, the same year she won a Soapy Award (a prelude to the Soap Opera Digest Awards). She received a Star on the Hollywood Walk of Fame and was on hand to receive her Daytime Emmy Award for Lifetime Achievement in 2004.

Warrick was a member of the Democratic Party, working with the administrations of John F. Kennedy, Lyndon Johnson and Jimmy Carter on labor and education issues. Upon Carter's 1980 defeat, she sent him a long letter thanking him for his efforts. He replied, telling her that if he had hired her as a speechwriter, he would have been reelected. Warrick had generally liberal political views. In her first years at All My Children, Warrick was flustered by her character's conservative politics and support of U.S. involvement in the Vietnam War, which Warrick strongly opposed.

In July 2000, she refused to accept a lifetime achievement award from the South Carolina Arts Commission because she was offended by legislators' decision to move the Confederate flag from the state Capitol dome to another spot on the grounds in response to a boycott of the state by flag opponents. A lifelong supporter of African American rights, she felt the flag should be removed completely, and commented, "In my view, this was no compromise. It was a deliberate affront to the African-Americans, who see it as a sign of oppression and hate".

In 1991, Warrick received a certification as a licensed metaphysical teacher from a Unity school in Lee's Summit, Missouri.

Death
Warrick died of complications related to pneumonia on January 15, 2005, aged 88, at her home in Manhattan.

Legacy
The January 24, 2005 episode of All My Children was dedicated "In Loving Memory of Ruth Warrick". Phoebe died offscreen on May 4. Phoebe's funeral was aired May 12, 2005. The episode featured many of Warrick's most notable performances as flashbacks, and included the return of many of the characters who had been heavily involved in her storylines over the years. Warrick was included in the memorial tribute at the 11th Screen Actors Guild Awards.

Film historian Scott Feinberg conducted the final interview with Warrick on August 14, 2004, at her apartment in New York City. After her death, her family put much of her estate in an auction.

The auction included her extensive collection of art and photographs, as well as books signed by Bill and Hillary Clinton. Signed scripts from Peyton Place and All My Children, as well as her Broadway appearances were also in the catalog. The centerpiece of the catalog was the 25th anniversary reprint script of Citizen Kane'', signed by Warrick, Cotten and Welles, one of only 100 printed. Her family donated her 2004 Lifetime Achievement Emmy Award to a museum in her hometown of Saint Joseph, Missouri.

Film credits

See also

References

External links

 
 
 
 
 
 Ruth Warrick profile at Soapcentral.com
 Interview with Ruth Warrick (July 1997) at Turner Classic Movies

1916 births
2005 deaths
20th-century American actresses
20th-century American singers
20th-century American women singers
Actors from St. Joseph, Missouri
Actresses from Missouri
American autobiographers
American film actresses
American musical theatre actresses
American soap opera actresses
American television actresses
Baptists from Missouri
California Democrats
Daytime Emmy Award winners
Metro-Goldwyn-Mayer contract players
Missouri Democrats
New York (state) Democrats
Women autobiographers
Baptists from California
Baptists from New York (state)
20th-century Baptists
Deaths from pneumonia in New York City
21st-century American women